Pine Bend is a census-designated place and unincorporated community in Island Lake Township, Mahnomen County, Minnesota, United States. Its population was 28 as of the 2010 census.

Demographics

Education
The community is served by Fosston Public Schools.

References

Census-designated places in Mahnomen County, Minnesota
Census-designated places in Minnesota